Ganchvor Sourp Asdvadzadzin is the Armenian Apostolic church in Famagusta, Cyprus.

History 
The church is located on the north-west side of the walled city of Famagusta, opposite the Carmelite church. It is a fortress-like building built in 1346 by Armenian refugees from Cilicia. It was built in a typical Armenian fashion but with Cypriot masonry and was part of an important monastic and cultural centre, where Saint Nerses Lampronatsi is said to have studied in the 12th century, suggesting the presence of an important theological institute.

Unused since 1571, it was preserved by the Department of Antiquities in 1907 and in 1936 it was leased to the Armenian community of Famagusta for a period of 99 years. After repairs between 1937 and 1944, the first liturgy was held on 14 January 1945 by Archimandrite Krikor Bahlavouni, but it was partially burnt by Turkish Cypriot militia in March 1957. After being repaired, it was used as a church until 1962. During the 1963–1964 intercommunal violence, it was taken over by Turkish Cypriots and then in August 1974 by the Turkish military, becoming part of the occupied area. Even after the partial lifting of movement restrictions by Northern Cyprus in 2003, it was still inaccessible, as it was located within a "military area". It is now accessible, since late 2005.

References

Armenian Apostolic monasteries
Christian monasteries established in the 14th century
Armenian churches in Cyprus
Buildings and structures in Famagusta
Churches in Northern Cyprus